Ríssia Inoani Cruz Oliveira (born 23 April 1995) is an Angolan handball player for Petro de Luanda and the Angolan national team.

She represented Angola at the 2017 World Women's Handball Championship in Germany.

References

Angolan female handball players
1995 births
Living people